Robert Willoughby, 2nd Baron Willoughby de Broke and de jure 10th Baron Latimer,  (1472 – 10 November 1521) was an English nobleman and soldier.

Robert Willoughby was born about 1470–1472 (aged 30 in 1502, 36 in 1506), the son of Sir Robert Willoughby, 1st Baron Willoughby de Broke (c. 1452–1502) and Blanche Champernowne. He married firstly before 28 Feb. 1494/95, to Elizabeth Beauchamp, daughter of Richard Beauchamp, 2nd Baron Beauchamp of Powick, and secondly, c. 1509, to Lady Dorothy Grey, daughter of Thomas Grey, 1st Marquess of Dorset and Cecily Bonville, 7th Baroness Harington. By his first wife he had two sons, Edward, Esq. (died 1517) and Sir Anthony, Kt., and by the second wife 6 children, including sons Henry and William, and daughters Elizabeth, who married John Paulet, 2nd Marquess of Winchester, and Anne, who married Charles Blount, 5th Baron Mountjoy.

He was knighted before 1504. He served in the army in France in 1513, and was apparently to be present at the Field of the Cloth of Gold in June 1520.

He inherited the title 2nd Baron Willoughby de Broke and 10th Baron Latimer on the death of his father in 1502. On his death, on 10 November 1521 at Bere Ferrers in Devon the title went into abeyance. His widow, Dorothy, married (2nd) before 29 July 1523 as his fourth wife, William Blount, 4th Baron Mountjoy.

Notes

References
 

Rogers, W.H. Hamilton, The Ancient Sepulchral Effigies and Monumental and Memorial Sculpture of Devon, Exeter, 1877, pp. 346–7 & Appendix 3, pedigree of Willoughby de Broke.
Rogers, W.H. Hamilton, The Strife of the Roses and Days of the Tudors in the West, Exeter, 1890, pp. 1–36, Willoughby de Broke
 
 Thepeerage

External links
 Biography of Robert Willoughby
 Biography

1472 births
1521 deaths
15th-century English people
16th-century English nobility
People from Wiltshire
English knights
Robert
Bere Ferrers
2